Koson (written: 篁村 or 古邨) is a masculine Japanese given name. Notable people with the name include:

 (1855–1922), Japanese writer
 (1877–1945), Japanese painter and printmaker

See also
Koson, Uzbekistan, a town in Qashqadaryo Region, Uzbekistan
Koson (village), a village in Zakarpattia Oblast, Ukraine
Coson, an inscription found on gold coins in Transilvania

Japanese masculine given names